Sterren Stralen Overal  is a 1953 Dutch film directed by . It stars the Dutch comedy duo Snip en Snap. With over one million admissions it is one of the most successful Dutch films of all time.

Cast
 Piet Muyselaar as Snap
 Willy Walden as Snip
 Kitty Janssen as daughter of Van Amstel
 Johan Kaart as taxi driver Piet van Amstel
 Guus Oster as daughter's friend
 Edwin Rutten		
 Peronne Hosang		
 Hetty Blok		
 Herbert Joeks

References

External links 

 

1953 films
Dutch black-and-white films
Dutch comedy films
Films directed by Gerard Rutten
1953 comedy films
1950s Dutch-language films